The Songadh Jain temple is a historical temple complex in the town of Songadh, in Bhavnagar district the Saurashtra region in Gujarat, India. It is 8 km from Sihor town and 28 km from Bhavnagar town.

Importance
Kanji Swami, a mystical teacher of Jainism, was born into Śvētāmbara Sthānakavāsī and converted to a celibate Digambara lay scholar under influence of Kundakunda & Pandit Todarmal, at Songadh in 1934. Sonagadh became birth place for Kanji Panth. Kanji Swami, spent about forty years at Songadh so the village became one of the most important pilgrimage for Kanji Panth. 

Songadh along with Palitana, Girnar, Naliya, Kathara, Idar, Tarangaji, and Ahmedabad are planned to be promoted as Gujarat Jain circuit by Gujarat tourism department.

Overview
The temple complex consist of eight temples. Svadhyaya Mandir or study temple, is the first temple in the temple complex built in 1937. The temple is a white marble structure with teachings of Kundakund engraved on the walls and embossed on golden leaf. Jinendra Dharmasabha houses a samavasarana, the divine preaching hall of the Tirthankaras, of Simandhara based on the description by Mahavideha. The temple has murals with depiction of the knowledge of true doctrine cascading like water steam from Simandhara to Kundakunda and Kundakunda to Kanji Swami.

In 2010, a 41.5 feet idol of Lord Bahubali was also installed here.

Other temples
 Paramagam Mandir, literally meaning Temple of Sacred Texts. Walls of this temple are carved with the Digambar Jain sacred texts of Samayasāra
 Jin Mandir
 Nandishwar Deep Mandir
 Manastambha
 Kanji Swami Samadhi Mandir
 Champa Ben Samadhi Mandir

Gallery

See also
Jainism in Gujarat

References

Citation

Sources

External links 
 

Bhavnagar district
20th-century Jain temples